Wertheim may refer to:

 Wertheim (surname)
 Wertheim (company), a company that manufactures vacuum cleaners
 Wertheim (department store), a chain of German department stores
 Wertheim & Co., an investment firm 
 Wertheim am Main, Baden-Württemberg, Germany
 Wertheim National Wildlife Refuge, a protected wetlands on Long Island, New York
 Wertheim Piano, an Australian brand of piano
 Wertheim-Meigs operation, a surgical procedure for the treatment of cervical cancer

See also
 
 Wertheimer, a surname
 Wertheim Gallery
 Wertheim effect
 Wertheim surgery